Susan Efay Ciriclio (November 27, 1946 -August 19, 2018), also known as S.E. Ciriclio, was an American photographer and educator particularly known for her photographic mapping project "Neighborhood".

She lived and worked in Oakland, California. Ciriclio worked for 40 years as a professor of photography at California College of the Arts (CCA), retiring as Professor Emerita in 2017.

Life and education
Ciriclio was born in 1946 in New York City, grew up in Westchester County, New York and later moved to Phoenix, Arizona. While she was a student at Phoenix College, she worked as a dispatcher and crime scene photographer for the Phoenix Police Department.

She received an A.A. from Phoenix College in 1969, a B.F.A. from California College of Arts and Crafts in 1972, and a M.F.A. from Mills College in 1974.

Career 
Early in her teaching career, Ciriclio was an instructor in photography at Chabot College and San Francisco Art Institute. Ciriclio was chair of CCA's photography program from 1988—1992, and 1999—2008. In addition to her work as a professor of photography at California College of the Arts, she also served as interim Vice President for Academic Affairs from 1986-1987 and as Vice President for Academic Affairs from 1989-1992. During her time in the position, Ciriclio made great progress in budget planning and faculty governance.

Aside from her work as a photography educator and academic administrator, Ciriclio also served on the board of directors at San Francisco Camerawork Gallery from 1983-1986.

Awards and fellowships
In 1979, Ciriclio was awarded a National Endowment for the Arts Fellowship.

Works
Ciriclio's map projects explore the chronicling of place; combining large scale map replicas with thousands of detail photographs of an area, in works that function both sculpturally and temporally.

Ciriclio cites her day to day surroundings as inspiration in her photographic practice; she searches out visual texture in the ordinariness of her suburban environment and neighborhood, documenting the visual landscape over time and compiling photographs into map works and book works.

Ciriclio's piece, "Neighborhood" was exhibited in 1977 as part of the group show San Francisco/Los Angeles/New York held at the San Francisco Art Institute and in 1980 as a solo exhibition at the University of California, Davis Memorial Union Art Gallery. The ordinariness of her suburban neighborhood, which she photographed for the piece, had a universal quality that viewers responded to identifying it was their neighborhood; whether that was in San Francisco, Salt Lake City or Atlanta. Hal Fischer described Ciriclio's piece as "sympathetic to the New Topographics genre".

Another of Ciriclio's works, "Haddon Roadwork" was featured as part of a group exhibition at 1708 Gallery in Richmond, Virginia in 1985 when it was known as 1708 East Main. Similar to Ciriclio's "Neighborhood", "Haddon Roadwork" also involved creating a map with pictures she had taken of houses along the streets of her neighborhood. As Mitchell Kahan wrote in Art Papers, "There is neither an aestheticized quality to them nor the cool detached aura of scientific documentation. They are as off hand and casual as a realtor's handbook".

Selected exhibitions
Ciriclio’s work has been featured in solo and group exhibitions.

Solo exhibitions
Susan Ciriclio had a solo exhibit at the Memorial Union Art Gallery at UC Davis in 1980.

Group exhibitions
Susan Ciriclio’s work has been selected for group exhibition including the following:

 deYoung Museum, San Francisco, New Photography: San Francisco and the Bay Area (1974)
 San Francisco Art Institute, San Francisco Los Angeles New York (1977)
 San Francisco Museum of Modern Art, Billboard Show (1979)
 1708 Gallery, Richmond, and SF Camerawork, San Francisco, Artists and Photographic Installations (1985)
 Axiom Centre for the Arts, Cheltenham, England, California Women in Photography (1987)
 Seibu Museum of Art, Tokyo, Young Californians (1989)
 Museum of New Mexico, Santa Fe, Forecast (1994)
 Kiyosato Museum of Photographic Arts, Yamanashi, Japan, An Artist and His Circle (1998)

Collections
Ciriclio's work is held in many permanent collections including:

 San Francisco Museum of Modern Art, San Francisco
 Oakland Museum, Oakland
 Barnsdall Collection, Los Angeles
 Seibu Museum, Tokyo
 Kiyosato Museum of Photographic Arts, Yamanashi, Japan
 Mills College, Oakland

References

External links
 "Sue Ciriclio Interview"

1946 births
2018 deaths
American women artists
American women photographers
National Endowment for the Arts Fellows
Artists from Oakland, California
California College of the Arts faculty
California College of the Arts alumni
Phoenix College alumni
Mills College alumni
American women academics
21st-century American women